NPAT or Npat may refer to:

 NPAT (gene)
 National Political Awareness Test
 Net profit after tax